{{DISPLAYTITLE:Delta2 Lyrae}}

Delta2 Lyrae (δ2 Lyr) is a 4th magnitude star in the constellation Lyra, approximately 900 light years away from Earth. It is one of the M4II spectral standard stars, meaning it is a bright giant star with a surface temperature around 3,600 kelvins.  It puts out more energy than 10,000 suns, although more than 90% of it at longer than visual wavelengths.  Direct angular measurements, combined with the Hipparcos parallax, give a radius of 1.1
- 1.3
astronomical units, comparable to the size calculated from other observed data.

It began life as a hot blue main sequence star, but now is a large cool asymptotic giant branch star with a degenerate carbon-oxygen core.  It is a semi-regular variable star that has its brightness change by 0.2 magnitudes over an ill-defined period. Delta2 Lyrae was once thought to form a visual binary with the star Delta1 Lyrae, but it does not, only appearing to do so if seen from earth's direction.

δ2 Lyrae is a variable star, probably a semiregular variable. It has a magnitude range of 4.22 to 4.33. It is the brightest member of the scattered open cluster Stephenson 1, also known as the δ Lyrae Cluster. Other known members include δ1 Lyrae, a handful of 8th-9th magnitudes stars, and at least thirty other stars down to 14th magnitude.

Multiple star catalogues list several companions to δ2 Lyrae, with designations such as ADS 11825. Two of them are a close pair of 10th magnitude stars about 87" from δ2, designated components B and C. The spectral type of the pair suggests that they are at the same distance as Delta2 Lyrae, which could mean that the three stars form a triple star system. In this case, the ADS 11825BC pair would be 24,000 AU away from δ2 Lyrae, and it would take 24,000 years for it to make an orbit. The two stars in the BC system take at least 10,500 years to make an orbit and are separated by 600AU.

References

Lyra (constellation)
Lyrae, Delta
Lyrae, 12
7139
175588
BD+36 3319
092791
M-type bright giants
Asymptotic-giant-branch stars
Semiregular variable stars